Brian "Cobi" Span (born February 23, 1992) is a Costa Rican-American professional soccer player who plays for Swedish club Haninge.

Club career

Span started out playing for FC Westchester as a youth player at age twelve. He stayed there for seven years and then went on to play two years of college soccer at the University of Virginia, scoring 12 goals and registering 8 assists during that time.

During the summer of 2011 he trained in Europe with German club TSG 1899 Hoffenheim and Örebro SK in Sweden. After his sophomore season that autumn, the winger felt ready to go professional but MLS did not offer him a Generation Adidas contract. Instead, the North Salem native signed a two-year deal with Djurgårdens IF in Swedish Allsvenskan.

Djurgårdens IF

Span made his debut on May 20, 2012. He came on at the 65th minute, replacing Ricardo Santos, and played the rest of the match. Three days later he scored his first professional goal in his first game as a starter to equalize 1–1 against Helsingborgs IF. Span's contract was not renewed following the 2013 season.

FC Dallas

On January 8, 2014, Span signed a contract with Major League Soccer and was allocated via a weighted lottery with FC Dallas, Chicago Fire, San Jose Earthquakes, New England Revolution and Real Salt Lake participating. FC Dallas acquired Span on January 9 in the weighted lottery.

Span was waived by Dallas on February 5, 2015.

Orlando City

Span was loaned to USL Pro club Orlando City on April 2, 2014.

International career

While not a recent national team participant, Span was a member of the U17 residency program in Bradenton, Florida.

In 2020, Span expressed his intention to play for the Costa Rica national team, motivated by his maternal family, who are relatives to Costa Rican legend Juan Cayasso.

Honours
IFK Mariehamn
 Veikkausliiga: 2016
 Finnish Cup: 2015

Västerås SK
 Division 1 Norra: 2018

References

External links

1992 births
Living people
American soccer players
African-American soccer players
American expatriate soccer players
Association football midfielders
Virginia Cavaliers men's soccer players
Reading United A.C. players
Djurgårdens IF Fotboll players
FC Dallas players
Orlando City SC (2010–2014) players
IFK Mariehamn players
Västerås SK Fotboll players
Soccer players from New York (state)
USL League Two players
Allsvenskan players
Veikkausliiga players
USL Championship players
Superettan players
Ettan Fotboll players
People from Somers, New York
American people of Costa Rican descent
21st-century African-American sportspeople
American expatriate sportspeople in Sweden
Expatriate footballers in Sweden
American expatriate sportspeople in Finland
Expatriate footballers in Finland